Travis William Smith (born November 7, 1972) is a former professional baseball pitcher. He pitched five seasons in Major League Baseball for the Milwaukee Brewers, St. Louis Cardinals, Atlanta Braves, and Florida Marlins. He also pitched one season for the SK Wyverns of the KBO League.

Smith played college baseball for the Texas Tech Red Raiders. He retired in 2007, while pitching for the Los Angeles Dodgers' Triple-A affiliate, the Las Vegas 51s.

References

External links

Major League Baseball pitchers
Milwaukee Brewers players
St. Louis Cardinals players
Atlanta Braves players
Florida Marlins players
SSG Landers players
Helena Brewers players
Stockton Ports players
El Paso Diablos players
Louisville Redbirds players
Ogden Raptors players
Huntsville Stars players
Indianapolis Indians players
Round Rock Express players
New Orleans Zephyrs players
Memphis Redbirds players
Richmond Braves players
Albuquerque Isotopes players
Las Vegas 51s players
KBO League pitchers
American expatriate baseball players in South Korea
Texas Tech Red Raiders baseball players
Baseball players from Illinois
1972 births
Living people